Rakesh Pandey is a four-term MLA (Member of Legislative Assembly) of Punjab from Ludhiana North. Pandey is a member of Indian National Congress. Pandey was first elected to the seat in 1992. He lost the seat in the 2022 Punjab Legislative Assembly election to Madan Lal Bagga of Aam Aadmi Party. 

He was born on 7 May 1955. His father Joginder Pal Pandey was a politician. 

Rakesh Pandey entered active politics in 1987 as President, District Youth Congress Committee, Ludhiana, Punjab.

References  

 https://web.archive.org/web/20130219063326/http://www.ludhianadistrict.com/personality/rakesh-pandey.php

1955 births
Living people
Punjab, India MLAs 1992–1997
Punjab, India MLAs 1997–2002
Punjab, India MLAs 2002–2007
Punjab, India MLAs 2007–2012
Politicians from Ludhiana
Punjab, India MLAs 2017–2022
Indian National Congress politicians from Punjab, India